The population statistics for Israeli settlements in the West Bank are collected by the Israel Central Bureau of Statistics. As such, the data contains only population of settlements recognized by the Israeli authorities. Israeli outposts, which are illegal by Israeli law, are not tracked, and their population is hard to establish. All settlements in the West Bank were advised by the International Court of Justice to be unlawful.  

As of January 2023, there are 144 Israeli settlements in the West Bank, including 12 in East Jerusalem. In addition, there are over 100 Israeli illegal outposts in the West Bank. In total, over 450,000 Israeli settlers live in the West Bank excluding East Jerusalem, with an additional 220,000 Jewish settlers residing in East Jerusalem. 

The construction of the West Bank barrier keeps a significant number of settlements behind it. The total number of settlers east of the barrier lines in 2012 was at least 79,230. By comparison, the number of Gaza Strip settlers in 2005 who refused to move voluntarily and be compensated, and that were forcibly evicted during the Israeli disengagement from Gaza, was around 9,000.

Statistics
Statistics below refer to the period between 1999 and 2018. For more recent data, see List of Israeli settlements.

Unreported Nahal settlements:
 Elisha (population of 753 in 2000)
 Gvaot (population of 44 in 2003)

Localities of unknown status:
 Bitronot
 Doran
 Ein Hogla
 Mahane Giv'on

Other localities:
 Shvut Rachel (est. 1991) – an independently governed settlement which is formally designated as a neighborhood of Shilo. As such, its population is counted within Shilo.

See also
 Israeli settlement
 Judea and Samaria Area
 List of cities administered by the State of Palestine
 List of cities in Israel
 List of Israeli settlements
 List of Israeli settlements with city status in the West Bank
 Population statistics for Israeli Gaza Strip settlements
 Yesha Council

Notes

External links
 Israeli Settlements Population in the West Bank at the Jewish Virtual Library
 Yesha Council
 FMEP Reports: Settlements in the West Bank

West Bank
Israel geography-related lists
Israeli settlement
Palestine (region)-related lists
Demographic lists